Franco Volpi may refer to:

 Franco Volpi (actor) (1921-1997)
 Franco Volpi (runner) (1936-2013)
 Franco Volpi (philosopher) (1952-2009)